New Hampshire's 17th State Senate district is one of 24 districts in the New Hampshire Senate. It has  been represented by Republican Howard Pearl since 2022.

Geography
District 17 covers parts of Merrimack, Rockingham, and Strafford Counties to the east of Concord, including the towns of Allenstown, Chichester, Deerfield, Epsom, Loudon, Northwood, Nottingham, Pembroke, Pittsfield, Raymond, and Strafford.

The district overlaps with both New Hampshire's 1st congressional district and New Hampshire's 2nd congressional district.

Recent election results

2022

Elections prior to 2022 were held under different district lines.

Historical election results

2020

2018

2016

2014

2012

Federal and statewide results in District 17

References

17
Merrimack County, New Hampshire
Rockingham County, New Hampshire
Strafford County, New Hampshire